Markéta Hurychová (born 9 April 1997) is a Czech female handball player for Saint-Amand Handball and the Czech national team.

She represented the Czech Republic at the 2020 European Women's Handball Championship.

References

1997 births
Living people
Czech female handball players
Expatriate handball players
Czech expatriate sportspeople in France
Czech expatriate sportspeople in Poland
21st-century Czech women